Ripley Township, Ohio may refer to:

Ripley Township, Holmes County, Ohio
Ripley Township, Huron County, Ohio

Ohio township disambiguation pages